Petrovskoye is a rural locality (a selo) and the administrative centre of Petrovsky Selsoviet, Ishimbaysky District, Bashkortostan, Russia. The population was 2,580 as of 2010. There are 21 streets.

Geography 
Petrovskoye is located 35 km northeast of Ishimbay (the district's administrative centre) by road. Vasilyevka is the nearest rural locality.

References 

Rural localities in Ishimbaysky District
Ufa Governorate